Jonathan Rashleigh (1642–1702) of Menabilly, near Fowey, Cornwall was Sheriff of Cornwall in 1686/87, and twice MP for Fowey 1675–1681 and 1689–1695. His portrait exists at Antony House, Torpoint, Cornwall, formerly the  home of his second wife Sarah Carew.

Origins
He was the eldest son of John Rashleigh (1621–1651; son and heir apparent of Jonathan Rashleigh (1591–1675) of Menabilly, whom he predeceased), MP for Fowey in 1661. Jonathan's mother was Joan Pollexfen (born 1620), a daughter of John Pollexfen of Kitley, Yealmpton, Devon , y his wife Cicilia Harris, daughter of John Harris of Radford, Plymstock, Devon.

Career
He served as MP for the family's pocket borough of Fowey from 24 May 1675 to March 1681 and again from 1689 to 1695. He increased the burgess votes he controlled in Fowey by purchasing further lands within the borough from his senior but less prominent cousins, the Rashleigh family of Coombe, Fowey.

Marriages and children
Rashleigh married twice. His first marriage was in 1673 to Anne Courtenay (died 1677), daughter of Sir Peter Courtenay (c. 1616 – 1670) of Trethurffe in Cornwall. He remarried in 1681 to Jane Carew (died 1700), a daughter of Sir John Carew, 3rd Baronet  (1635–1692) of Antony, Cornwall, by whom he had four sons and four daughters including:
Philip Rashleigh (1689–1736), eldest son and heir,  MP for Liskeard 1710–1722. He rebuilt and enlarged the mansion house at Menabilly between  about 1710–15, but died without children. 
Jonathan Rashleigh (1690–1764), fourth son, of Menabilly, MP for Fowey. He was a co-heir (with his great-nephew Reginald Pole Carew (1753–1835)) of his half first-cousin Sir Coventry Carew, 6th Baronet (died 1748) of Antony, from whom he inherited several manors in Cornwall.

Sarah Rashleigh, who married Rev. Carolus Pole (1686–1731), Rector of St Breock in Cornwall, third son of Sir John Pole, 3rd Baronet (1649–1708) of Shute, Devon. His portrait survives at Antony. Her grandson was Reginald Pole Carew (1753–1835).

Death and burial
He died and was later buried on 11 September 1702. He bequeathed funds for the upkeep of eight poor widows in the almshouses built by his grandfather.

References

Sources

Burke's Genealogical and Heraldic History of the Landed Gentry, 15th Edition, ed. Pirie-Gordon, H., London, 1937, pp. 1891–3, Rashleigh of Menabilly
Cruickshanks, Eveline & Handley, Stuart, biography of Rashleigh, Jonathan (1642-1702), of Menabilly, published in History of Parliament, House of Commons 1690-1715, ed. D. Hayton, E. Cruickshanks, S. Handley, 2002

Jonathan
1642 births
1702 deaths
High Sheriffs of Cornwall
Members of the pre-1707 English Parliament for constituencies in Cornwall
English MPs 1661–1679
English MPs 1679
English MPs 1680–1681
English MPs 1689–1690
English MPs 1690–1695